Hafteh Khanak (also Romanized as Hafteh Khānak) is a village in Khenejin Rural District, in the Central District of Komijan County, Markazi Province, Iran. At the 2006 census, its population was 177, in 39 families.

References 

Populated places in Komijan County